A. Ladson (born December 7, 1989), better known by his stage name Rayne Storm, is an American rapper and producer from Harlem, New York.  He initially gained attention in 2006 with the release of his first mixtape Storms Coming. Since his debut on Storms Coming, Rayne has founded the independent label Monopolyhouse, released several remixes to chart-topping or viral songs and has made a number of guest appearances. On January 1, 2016, Rayne released his EP titled Supreme with features from Tash (rapper) of Tha Alkaholiks, DecadeZ, L.I.V.E.Wire, iLL Drew, Profane Remy, Black Silver, Perelini and Harlem Hitman. Supreme EP was re-released in 2018 with "All Black (Black Panther Remix)" inspired by the Marvel movie Black Panther as well as a new song "Work (Who Gettin' It)" and intro/outro skits.

Early life
Rayne, who is of African American and Native American descent, was raised in Harlem and spent most of his childhood growing up in New York City. He began writing rhymes while a sophomore in high school after a competition with friends. As a senior, Rayne became a television and radio show host for Teen Talk Productions. As a host of the television show, he won a PASS Award for an episode about the September 11 attacks.  As a radio show host he interviewed "World Hop" artist Don Yute and 90s R&B singer Horace Brown. After graduating Rayne joined Art Start's Hip-Hop Project, which collaborated with Russell Simmons and others, leading to the documentary The Hip Hop Project, executive produced by Bruce Willis and Queen Latifah. Rayne later spent a few years recording with the independent label Ravenel Records before pursuing a career as an independent artist and producer.

Career
In 2006, Rayne released his first mixtape Storms Coming which gained him a small buzz and recognition. He later released The Unkrowned King (2008), Storms Coming TWS Edition (2010) and Supreme: The Mixtape (Dec 2015). On Jan 1, 2016 he released his first official EP, Supreme, which was re-released in 2018 with "All Black (Black Panther Remix)" inspired by the Black Panther Marvel movie as well as a new song "Work (Who Gettin' It)" and intro/outro skits. The first "Remixes" mixtape was released in 2017 with next 2 installments coming back to back in October and November 2018. "Remixes IV" was released in March 2019 and the next installment, "Remixes V" on October 17, 2020. "The Classic Collection" is a 3 mixtape compilation of freestyles, remixes and features released individually between June and July 2018. On December 7 2020, Rayne released his long awaited debut album "Uptown Baby and the follow up to his first mixtape, Storms Coming II on April 3, 2021.

Rayne's next EP "Summer In The City" was released on Sept 21, 2021 and featured a music video for the title track. Rayne Storm's sophomore album "AudioCity" is his most successful to date gaining over 150,000 Spotify streams in its first year of release. "AudioCity" debuted on February 22, 2022 and contained high profile features such as DMC, Sticky Fingaz & Canibus. The album topped the iTunes charts in Bahrain (#4 in Hip-Hop and #21 in All Genres) with the single "Revenge" ft. Jarren Benton & Kony Brooks and South Africa (#35 in Hip-Hop) with "Dive Bar" ft. Killah Priest and KingFsorrow. "Remixes VI" was released on December 22, 2022 and included original songs such as "Armageddon" ft. Killah Priest & KingFsorrow, "Verzuz (Run This Shit)" and "Just Gettin' Warm".

Artistry
Rayne is best known for his cadence, flow and unique production style. His rap influences include Big L, Jay Z, The Lox (Styles P, Jadakiss & Sheek Louch), Mobb Deep (Prodigy & Havoc), Nas, The Notorious B.I.G. & Tupac. He names producers Dr. Dre, Pharrell Williams, DJ Premier, Kanye West, Timbaland, Ryan Leslie & Frank Zappa as inspiration for his production.

Discography

Mixtapes

Albums/EP's

Guest appearances

Singles

References

External links
 Official website

1983 births
African-American male rappers
Living people
Rappers from Manhattan
21st-century American rappers
21st-century American male musicians
21st-century African-American musicians
20th-century African-American people